The International Centre for Tax and Development (ICTD) is a research centre based at the Institute of Development Studies. The ICTD is focused on improving tax policy and administration in lower-income countries through collaborative research and engagement. It supports its partners in raising more revenue to fund public services in ways that are efficient, equitable, and strengthen accountability.

The ICTD was founded in 2010. It is funded by the UK's Foreign, Commonwealth and Development Office (FCDO), the Bill & Melinda Gates Foundation, and the Norwegian Agency for Development Cooperation (Norad). 

The ICTD fosters a network of social science researchers from developing countries to engage with taxation issues by funding research, delivering research courses and workshops, and collaborating with a range of partners including various African tax administrations and ministries of finance. It disseminates its research evidence to policymakers through publications, communications, and conferences in Africa. Through its work, the ICTD aims to contribute to advancing sustainable development by reducing inequality, fostering inclusive growth, and enhancing governance.

Research
The ICTD's research aims to generate knowledge to make tax systems in lower-income countries, particularly in sub-Saharan Africa, more efficient, fair and transparent. To this end, the ICTD conducts and provides grants for research on the following themes:

 Tax administration and compliance
 Tax and governance
 Subnational and property tax
 Informality and tax
International tax
 Tax, welfare, and inequality
 Gender and tax

In order to facilitate better research on tax issues, the ICTD created the Government Revenue Dataset, the most complete and accurate cross-country dataset on government revenue, which importantly separates natural resource revenue from other revenue streams. In early 2019, UNU-WIDER launched the GRD Explorer, a tool that allows users to quickly and easily access and visualise the data contained in the Government Revenue Dataset.

Publications
ICTD has published and supported the publication of many working papers, policy briefs, journal articles, and books. They also publish 2-page brief summaries of their research, available in both English and French.

In July 2018, Taxing Africa was published by Zed Books as a part of their African Arguments series. The book offers a cutting-edge analysis on all aspects of the continent’s tax regime, displaying the crucial role such arrangements have on attempts to create social justice and push economic advancement. From tax evasion by multinational corporations and African elites to how ordinary people navigate complex webs of ‘informal’ local taxation, the book examines the potential for reform, and how space might be created for enabling locally-led strategies.

Programmes

Local Government Revenue Initiative 
The Local Government Revenue Initiative (LoGRI) is based at the Munk School of Global Affairs. LoGRI supports governments in raising local revenue more fairly and in ways that promote trust, transparency, and accountability. It does this by:

 Partnering with governments to provide hands-on support and advice
 Conducting collaborative, applied research to inform reform projects
 Developing operational tools, including technology solutions
 Delivering skills training to develop local capacity

The LoGRI team also engages with regional and international stakeholders on local financing issues, to share insights and shape policy.
stimulates and encourages wider use of more effective property tax systems in Africa.

DIGITAX 
The DIGITAX Research Programme aims to generate knowledge and evidence to advise and support governments and other stakeholders in overcoming challenges and leveraging opportunities at the interface of:

 digital financial services
 digital IDs, and
 tax.

DIGITAX delivers advice and support based on robust, relevant, and cutting-edge research on the taxation of mobile money and other digital financial services, as well as on the digitalisation of tax systems across lower-income countries, with a particular focus on Africa. The programme is funded by the  funded by the Bill & Melinda Gates Foundation.

References

External links
 

 East Sussex
Development studies
2010 establishments in England
Social science institutes
Public administration
Tax organizations